Louis Thomas (also Louis Thomas-Saint-Aubin and Louis Saint-Aubin; c. 1766–1869) was a Maliseet chief. He was designated a Person of National Historic Significance in 2002 in recognition of his efforts as a "defender of Maliseet interests and rights".

References

Maliseet people
Persons of National Historic Significance (Canada)

1760s births
1869 deaths
Year of birth uncertain